Juan de Landa (1894–1968) was a Spanish film actor, who was born in the Basque Country. de Landa entered the film industry in 1930 following the arrival of sound film. He initially acted in Spanish-language versions of Hollywood films, but later worked mainly in the Spanish and Italian film industries. His best-known role is in Luchino Visconti's 1943 film Ossessione.

Partial filmography

 El último de los Vargas (1930) - Capitán de los Rurales
 El valiente (1930) - Sargento de policia
 El presidio (1930) - Butch
 De frente, marchen (1930) - El sargento Gruñón
 La fruta amarga (1931) - Bill
 Love in Every Port (1931) - Tripode
 Su última noche (1931) - Aquiles Desano
 The Trial of Mary Dugan (1931) - Insp. Hunt
 Se ha fugado un preso (1935)
 El secreto de Ana María (1936)
 Al margen de la ley (1936)
 Carmen fra i rossi (1939) - Amalio
 The Sin of Rogelia Sanchez (1940) - Massimo
 Saint Rogelia (1940) - Máximo
 L'uomo della legione (1940) - Antonio Scotto, il meccanico
 The Pirate's Dream (1940) - Bieco de la Muerte
 La forza bruta (1941) - Bob
 Giuliano de' Medici (1941) - Goro
 The Prisoner of Santa Cruz (1941) - Pietro
 The King's Jester (1941) - Sparafucile
 Oro nero (1942) - Pietro, il minatore
 Tragic Night (1942) - Faille
 Ossessione (1943) - Giuseppe Bragana
 National Velvet (1944) - Padron Giovanni
 Noche sin cielo (1947) - Federico
 The Drummer of Bruch (1948) - Tomàs
 The Party Goes On (1948) - Padre prior
 Just Any Woman (1949) - Padre de Luis
 In a Corner of Spain (1949) - Alcalde
 The Maragatan Sphinx (1950) - Tío Cristóbal
 My Beloved Juan (1950) - Sebastián
 The Vila Family (1950) - Teófilo Torrens
 Alina (1950) - Lucien
 Devotion (1950) - Don Vidris, il prete
 Brief Rapture (1951) - Capobanda
 Salvate mia figlia (1951)
 One Hundred Little Mothers (1952) - Don Michele
 The Dream of Zorro (1952) - César / Pedro
 The Woman Who Invented Love (1952) - Usuraio Passadonato
 La figlia del diavolo (1952) - Il boia
 Redemption (1952) - Parroco
 Captain Phantom (1953) - Carlos
 Beat the Devil (1953) - Hispano-Suiza Driver
 El hombre que veía la muerte (1953)
 We Stole a Tram (1956) - Rossi
 Faustina (1957) - Mefistófeles
 Los ángeles del volante (1957) - Nicolás
 The Man Who Wagged His Tail (1957) - Butcher
 Cuatro en la frontera (1958) - (final film role)

References

External links

Bibliography
 Bacon, Henry. Visconti: Explorations of Beauty and Decay. Cambridge University Press, 1998.

1894 births
1968 deaths
Spanish male film actors
People from Debabarrena
Deaths from cancer in Spain
Deaths from liver cancer